Mohammad Dehghan Nejad (born July 19, 2000) is an Iranian footballer who plays as a winger for Iranian club Naft Masjed Soleyman in the Persian Gulf Pro League.

Club career

Naft Masjed Soleyman
On 5 October 2021, Mohebi moved to Naft Masjed Soleyman. He made his debut for Naft Masjed Soleyman in 2nd fixtures of 2021–22 Persian Gulf Pro League against Sepahan while he substituted in for Sina Khadempour.

References

Living people
2000 births
Association football wingers
Iranian footballers
Esteghlal F.C. players
Naft Masjed Soleyman F.C. players